Sean Seaton, known professionally as Neenyo, is a Canadian record producer and songwriter. He is known for his works with Drake, PARTYNEXTDOOR as well as various artists including Future, Mr. Probz, blackbear, Jadakiss and Lloyd Banks.

Life and career 
Neenyo was born and raised in the Toronto suburb of Mississauga. He was influenced by his older brother who was a DJ at nightclubs and his uncle, the Canadian Hip-Hop producer/DJ Howard Huges. Neenyo began "DJ-ing" at home during his adolescent years when mixtapes were becoming popular. He then ventured into electronic infused R&B music.

Neenyo and PartyNextDoor grew up in the same neighborhood in Mississauga, Ontario, and they would later share their ideas and thoughts about music. Having produced for Lloyd Banks' "Gang Green Season" and Dipset's "I’m Reloaded" in his early career, helped him entering into the American market. He later went to produce Drake on his Comeback Season mixtape and make beats for many more, including Fabolous, Grafh, Red Café and Jadakiss. In 2009 Jadakiss's The Last Kiss album which he produced ranked #1 on Billboard's Top rap albums chart. Since then, he has had the opportunity to work with Akon, The Lox, Bobby Valentino, Collie Buddz and others. In 2015, Neenyo produced another song titled “Plastic Bag” for Drake and Future's platinum-selling What a Time to Be Alive project.

Neenyo works together with PARTYNEXTDOOR and collaborated with two studio albums PartyNextDoor Two and PartyNextDoor 3. In P2, he produced two songs titled "Sex on the Beach" and "Grown Woman". On the other album his produced tracks are "You've Been Missed", "Transparency" and "Don't Know How". Both albums were released under the label of OVO Sound. He has also produced mixes for an installment of HYPETRAK’s ongoing mix series, i-D magazine and London based RinseFM 106.8 

In March 2016, Neenyo collaborated with Canadian fashion designer Mikhael Kale, creating and producing the runway show for his fall-winter collection in Toronto Fashion Week.

Music and production style 
Neenyo mainly produces songs in the R&B and hip hop genre. He describes his style as “Creating music off of emotions". In an interview given to Vice magazine, he mentions, "I don't think there's a song that I don't make an emotion out of because that's my whole goal for every song I do" 

Neenyo has cited numerous influences on his music, including Timbaland, Noah “40” Shebib  and Jodeci.

Production discography

Awards and recognition 
Neenyo has consecutively produced on four #1 Billboard albums. Drake and Future's What A Time To Be Alive debuted #1 on Billboard's Top200 chart. It was also nominated for 2016 American Music Awards at Favorite Album (Rap/HipHop) category. PARTYNEXTDOOR's PartyNextDoor Two and P3 projects both debuted at #1 on Billboard's R&B Album chart. Jadakiss' The Last Kiss debuted at #1 on Billboard's HipHop/R&B Album chart.

References 

Living people
Canadian record producers
Canadian songwriters
Writers from Mississauga
Year of birth missing (living people)